San Gregorio is a former church in Venice, northern Italy, located in the sestiere (district/neighborhood; literally "sixth") of Dorsoduro. It is not far from  Santa Maria della Salute basilica, behind the Palazzo Genovese.

It was founded in the 9th century and, in the 13th century, it became a Benedictine abbey. In the mid-15th century it was rebuilt to the current appearance under design by Antonio da Cremona. In 1775, after a long period of crisis, the monastery was closed and in 1807, after the Napoleonic occupation of Italy, also the parish church was suppressed. Deconsecrated, it was converted into a mint laboratory and then an art restoration center. It is now closed and not used.

It has a Gothic exterior with an ogival portal, elongated mullioned windows with ogival top and apse.

Sources

Gregorio
Brick Gothic
Gothic architecture in Venice
15th-century Roman Catholic church buildings in Italy
9th-century establishments in Italy
1775 disestablishments in Italy
Brick buildings and structures